Hell is an American doom metal solo project formed in 2008 by M.S.W., a multi-instrumentalist from Salem, Oregon. Hell began as a creative outlet for M.S.W., but it eventually gained momentum and grew to include a touring band. According to M.S.W., the project disregards typical religious themes and instead focuses on the concept of a "personal Hell".

History
In 2008, M.S.W. created Hell as a solo endeavor. Regarding the project developing into something greater, he said:

In 2009, the project's first album, Hell I, was released through Woodsmoke as a cassette limited to 100 copies. The debut's followup, Hell II, was released a year later in 2010, and incorporated new subgenres of extreme metal for the project, like black metal. The conclusion of the initial trilogy, Hell III, was released in 2012 and adopted operatic and symphonic elements. After gathering an underground following, Hell performed at Roadburn 2016 and is scheduled to perform again at the festival's 2018 edition. In 2017, Hell released its self-titled album to critical acclaim.

Many of Hell's studio albums borrow their cover art style from the work of Gustave Doré, albeit tinted red.

Band members
Hell
 M.S.W. – songwriting, vocals, guitars, bass, drums

Additional touring members
 Liam Neighbors (A.L.N.) – drums
 Nate Meyers – bass
 Sheene Coffin – guitar

Past touring members
 Gina Hendrika Eygenhuysen – violin
 Kyle Wattson – drums
 Adam T. – drums
 Paul Reidel – guitar
 Kento Woolrey – guitar

Discography
Studio albums
 Hell I (2009)
 Hell II (2010)
 Hell III (2012)
 Hell (2017)

Extended plays
 Hell (2015)

Splits
 Ancestortooth/Hell – with Ancestortooth (2009)
 Resurrection Bay – with Thou (2012)
 Amarok/Hell – with Amarok (2013)
 Live Split – with Hail (2013)
 Hell/Mizmor – with Mizmor (2014)
 Hell/Primitive Man – with Primitive Man (2019)

Compilations
 Tour Through Hell 2013 (2013)
 Trilogy (2013)
 MMXVI (2014)
 Splits (2018)

Live albums
 Sheol (2014)
 Live at Roadburn 2018 (2019)

References

External links
 Hell on Discogs
 Hell on Bandcamp

American doom metal musical groups
2008 establishments in Oregon
Heavy metal musical groups from Oregon
Musical groups established in 2008
Musicians from Salem, Oregon